XHCTN-FM is a radio station on 89.9 FM in La Trinitaria, Chiapas. It is part of the state-owned Radio Chiapas state network and is known as Brisas de Montebello.

XHCTN signed on August 13, 2003.

References

Radio stations in Chiapas
Public radio in Mexico